The Penistone Paramount Cinema is a community cinema and theatre in Penistone, near Barnsley, in the heart of the South Yorkshire Pennines. Besides the big film releases, there are live shows and monthly organ concerts.

The cinema is also home to one of the few working theatre organs in the country. The Paramount Compton Organ has been recently rebuilt, and was the reason why the cinema was renamed from the Metro Cinema.

The Compton Organ was built in 1937 by the John Compton Organ Company in London, especially for the Paramount Theatre in Birmingham.

The organ was removed from there in 1988 when the cinema was refurbished and made into a multiplex. It was then moved to the Regal in Oswestry, where it stayed until the cinema closed in 1994.

In 2000 The Penistone Cinema Organ Trust purchased the organ, and all of the 1000 pipes were cleaned out as part of the organ restoration. The trust then made an agreement with the council for the organ to be based there.  The cinema was then renamed as the Paramount in honour of the new resident. 
The building itself remains the property of Barnsley Metropolitan District Council, and is leased back to Penistone Town Council to keep it open as a cinema. The cinema was featured on the BBC Politics Show as an example of how a small provincial community cinema can survive.

In 2016 it was used as the cinema setting for episode 2 of Brief Encounters (TV series).

External links
Penistone Paramount Cinema website
http://www.cinema-organs.org.uk

Buildings and structures in the Metropolitan Borough of Barnsley
Cinemas in Yorkshire
Penistone
Theatres in South Yorkshire